Worcester Music Festival is an annual music festival held in more than 20 venues throughout the city centre of  Worcester, England every September. It was founded in 2008 by Chris Bennion as a platform to encourage live, local and original music in Worcester and the surrounding areas and is staged in pubs, clubs, cafes, community buildings, boats, churches, record shops and street performances around or near the city centre with around 250 performances each year. Recently acts have applied from further afield such as Egypt, Russia, Romania and America, however the organisers look at each application carefully as the festival is first and foremost about promoting emerging artists.

With more than 20 different promoters now involved in the festival, ensuring that every genre of music is covered and every music fan is catered for, the festival is also closely linked to BBC Hereford & Worcester, with a stage arranged by Andrew Marston from the BBC Introducing show, and features acts that have appeared on the show being broadcast from the festival and the very popular SLAP Magazine. The festival is a non-profit making event run by an enthusiastic team of 20 volunteers, largely local musicians or people associated with the Worcester music scene.  Not only does it provide a showcase for local musical talent of all genres, but it provides education and professional development opportunities through a variety of workshops and clinics.

The festival also has a history of being the place where new bands and projects have been formed, as musicians and artists have networked over the years. All Worcester Music Festival gigs and workshops are free to attend.

Bands
The following artists performed at these previous festivals

2008
 
 1147am
 And What Will Be Left Of Them?
 Angelcynn /Foxtail Soup /Ouja
 Anna Rice
 Babajack
 Black cat Bone
 Black Sheep
 BlueRADIO
 Brontosaurus Chorus
 Bruno Gallone
 BSN [420]
 Calm Like  A Riot
 Calming
 Claire Boswell
 Cmajor7
 Cobweb Dilemmas
 Come Together
 Corda
 Crooked Empire
 Da Vinci
 Dan Greenaway
 Dandelion Killers
 Danse Macabre
 David Bristow
 Dissidence
 Doctor & The Duke
 Doctors Orders
 Drumlove
 Dudes Of Neptune
 Evangaline
 Expedestrian
 Fallen Angel
 Faullsgold
 Figures of Hate
 Fine and Shandy
 Flames of Our Neighbours
 Flo Rowland
 Flo Rowland
 FreewateR
 Fury
 Fusion
 Fusion
 Gamble Gamble
 George Cowley Experience
 Harlem Dandy
 Harry Payne
 Harry Payne
 Highway 5
 HiJack
 Host
 Hot Wyred
 Jamie Knight
 Jasper
 Jazica
 Jess Allen
 John Perkins
 Johnny Kowalski
 Judy  Pass
 Jules Benjamin The Fingers
 Kahuna
 Lou Richardson
 Lounge Potato
 Martyr De Mona
 Matt Woozey & Strange Rain
 Meg
 Muleskinner Blues Band
 Natalie Hall
 Neil Ivision & The Misers
 Open Savana
 Penny White
 Pippa Jennings
 Poor Bob
 Reprise
 Revolver
 Robin Welch
 Rupert & The Robbers
 Sam Eden Experience
 Scandal House
 Shellshock
 Shoot The Moon
 Shurikume
 Silver Tequila
 Skankbox
 Slidin’ Steve
 Smokestack
 Somers Traditional Folk Club
 Soul Syndicate
 Steve Maitland
 Stunt Dog
 Take The Fifth
 Ten Fifty
 Tenth Aggression
 Terror Mob
 The Abbot Of Reason
 The Abbot Of Unreason
 The Amateurs
 The Arquettes
 The Big Cats
 The Brazilians
 The Cape Of Good Hope
 The Dastards
 The Donns
 The Fingers
 The Fire Balls
 The Lexie Stobie Band
 The Ragged Crows
 The Royal Alberts
 The Worrisome Ankle Trout
 The Zo Show
 The   Magoos
 Untitled Musical Project
 Velvet Trick
 Wake (from the Dastards
 Warmoth
 Warpath
 Weak 13
 Will Dance For Chocolate
 WSRP
 Zanders Of Severn
 Zophie

2018

14 September 
 
 The Stiff Joints
 Skewwhiff
 The Fidgets
 The Miffs
 Howard James Kenny
 nth cave
 I
 The Lion
 Misanthropic Existence
 DEVILS
 Hump De Bump
 Bleeding Hearts
 Connor Maher Quartet
 Set em up Joe
 GagReflex
 7Suns
 Lower Loveday
 Mice in a Matchbox
 The Other Dramas
 Born Zero
 The Desperados
 S K Y L Y T S
 Jack Monopoli
 Glitch
 Don Mac
 Liberty Artillery
 GOWST (formally Esteban)
 Trevino Slaxx
 Jack Blackman
 Elgar School of Music Folk Ensemble
 Horror On The High Seas
 Liar Liar
 Mark Stevenson
 Pre Sleep Monologue
 Niall McKenna
 The Pink Diamond Revue
 Parson City
 Anna Mason
 Shepherd’s Purse
 Dave Ryles and Barrie Scott
 Jake Of Diamonds
 Maefield
 Calming River
 Bitterroots
 3WOD
 Institutes
 Don’t Mess with Katie
 Rebel Station
 Immy & The Boatman
 Hitchhiker
 Rod Willmott
 AnyPercent
 Copper Feel
 Andy Tyler and Ray Sanders
 The Cowleys
 Lycio
 Sean Jeffery
 Ruben Seabright
 Nobby von Wright
 Immy & The Boatman plus friends.

15 September
 
 Swaktang
 The Humdrum Express
 Leg Puppy
 Nigel Clark (Dodgy) and compere for evening
 Jake Martin
 Criminal Mind
 Nasty Little Lonely
 Violet
 The Storyville Mob
 Vonhorn
 Kiss Me
 Killer
 The Collective
 Arcadia Roots
 Ivory Wave
 Yur Mum
 Inwards
 White Rhino
 SODEN
 Voodoo Stone
 Worcestershire Levellers
 Socket
 Grave Altar
 Johnny Kowalski and the Sexy Weirdos
 The Purple Shades
 Bloody English
 Colin Baggs Acoustic Guitarist
 Esuna
 Victoria Crivelli
 Flying Ant Day
 Polly Edwards
 Ross Angeles
 Twist Helix
 Dogs Of Santorini
 Stone Mountain Sinners
 Bryony Williams
 Plastic Scene
 The Atrocity Exhibit
 As Mamas
 I CAN
 I CAN’T
 Black Boxes
 Jess Silk
 Happy Bones
 Viv Bell and Huw Knight
 SLTR
 Free Galaxy
 Big Fat Shorty
 grownuplife
 Ellisha Green
 Bob Jones
 Vinny Peculiar
 The Contact High
 The Social Experiment
 Monkwood Green
 Deathly Pale Party
 Benjamin Dallow
 You Dirty Blue
 B.W.Pike
 The Arboretum
 Redwood
 Savannah (Savannahuk)
 Pablo Alto
 The Chase
 Dan Lewis
 B-Sydes
 Poorboys of Worcester
 The Boatman
 Hipflask Virgins
 Chloe Mogg
 Luke Wylde and the Japes
 Heartwork
 UnPunkt
 Blue Ridge Express
 The Jericho Racks
 Low Red Moon
 Tazmin Barnes
 Woo Town Hillbillies
 Bethany Roberts
 Wisenheimer
 Kringo Blue and Poppy Waterman Smith
 Jam Sessions – multi artists
 Worcester School of Rock and Performance
 Georgie and Dave
 Ajay Srivastav0
 Vo Fletcher
 Emma Howett and Lisa
 Gavin Miller
 Rubella Moon
 Bromsgrove Rock School
 Every Thread
 Freya MacKinnon
 Bandeoke with Polkadot Robot
 Nobby von Wright
 REG
 Social Outcasts
 Chip Langley & The Kidgloves
 Belly Fusion
 Song and tune session
 Rock Choir
 Guerrilla Studio
 Chevy Chase Stole My Wife.

16 September
 
 The Hungry Ghosts
 MeMeDetroit
 Ten Tombs
 Junior Weeb
 Navajo Ace
 Rival Karma
 Tyler Massey Trio
 The Desperados
 Coat of Many
 Redwood
 Goldblume
 Danny Starr
 Chip Langley & The Kidgloves
 Riché
 Shiraz Hempstock
 Sleephawk
 Hey Jester
 Dan Hartland
 Thunder and the Giants
 The Strays
 Terminal Rage
 Hannah Law Band
 Sean Harrington
 The Lost Notes
 Vicki Pingree
 Kate Lomas
 RVRMN
 Amit Dattani
 MoZie
 Faith
 Electric Raptor
 Dharma Bums
 Blushes
 Balaban and the Bald Illeagles
 Rosebud
 White Noise Cinema
 The Naughty Corner Ukulele Band
 Mitch Loveridge
 Dan Greenaway
 B Movie Heroes
 ORE
 Colossus Yeti
 Polly Edwards
 Juniper Nights
 Stone Mountain Sinners
 Aaron Douglas
 Paul Lennox
 Drumlove & friends with Ital sounds
 Deathly Pale Party
 The Collective
 Jenny Hallam
 Oli Barton & The Movement
 Grande Valise
 Mutante
 Madi Stimpson Trio
 Flex
 Jay & Eli
 Collective 43
 The Jericho Racks
 Bird Brother
 Smokin Pilchards
 Immy & The Boatman
 Toad Pack & Pablo
 Bryn Teeling & The River Thieves
 VALA
 As Mamas
 Kringo Blue and Poppy Waterman Smith
 Neon Creatures (Louisa and Andy acoustic set)
 Big Fat Shorty
 Vince Ballard
 Leifur Jonsson
 The Fidgets
 House of Wolvxs
 Karyo
 VoxRox Choir
 Bring your vinyl
 eat and chill
 Play it again Dan
 Glitch
 White Rhino
 Howard James Kenny.

Charities
Each year the Festival supports different local charities selected from a list of nominations. Money for the nominated charities is raised by way of donations and collection buckets at the venues. To date, the festival has raised over £55,0000 for charities.

2008 
 Headway Worcester Trust
 Acorns children's hospice
 St Richards hospice 
 Tudor house

2009
 Worcester Talking Newspapers For The Blind
 Choice Hospital Radio

2010
 Worcester Wheels
 Worcester Snoezelen

2011
 Maggs Day Centre

2012
 New Hope

2013
 Worcester Deaf Children's Society
 Worcester Sight Concern

2014
 Worcestershire Young Carers

2015
 Worcestershire Rape & Sexual Abuse Support Centre

2016
 Acorns Children's Hospice

2017
 St Paul's Hostel

2018
 Worcestershire Association of Carers

References

External links
 Official website

Music festivals in Worcestershire
Culture in Worcester, England
Recurring events established in 2008
2008 establishments in England
Annual events in the United Kingdom